The Atlantic City Speedway was a board oval racing track located near Hammonton, New Jersey. The track was built in 1926, and hosted eight American Automobile Association sanctioned races before the track was demolished in 1933.

AAA Champ Car race winners

See also

References

External links
 Maser, Jill (2005), The White Horse Pike (Images of America), Arcadia Publishing (Chicago, Illinois), p. 105. .
 Ghost Riders in the Pines
 Atlantic City Speedway
 

Defunct motorsport venues in the United States
Dirt oval race tracks in the United States
Motorsport venues in New Jersey
Hammonton, New Jersey
1926 establishments in New Jersey
1933 disestablishments in New Jersey
Sports venues completed in 1926
Sports venues demolished in 1933
Sports in Atlantic County, New Jersey
Buildings and structures in Atlantic County, New Jersey